The 1968–69 Soviet Championship League season was the 23rd season of the Soviet Championship League, the top level of ice hockey in the Soviet Union. 12 teams participated in the league, and Spartak Moscow won the championship.

First round

Final round

External links
Season on hockeystars.ru

1968–69 in Soviet ice hockey
Soviet
Soviet League seasons